Rahachow District is a second-level administrative subdivision (raion) of Belarus in Gomel Region. The administrative seat and largest city is the city of Rahachow.

Rahačoŭ District
Districts of Gomel Region